Max Warmerdam (born 30 March 2000) is a Dutch chess player. He qualified for the title of grandmaster in 2021.

Chess career
Warmerdam earned his FIDE master title in 2015, followed by the international master title in 2018. After qualifying through the "top nine-round event" at the 2019 Tata Steel Chess Tournament, Warmerdam was invited to compete at the Tata Steel Challengers in 2020. He placed 12th with 4½/13 (+2–6=5). During the tournament, he defeated the eventual winner David Antón Guijarro with the black pieces. As of 2020, Warmerdam is coached by Loek van Wely.

From 3 to 7 January 2021, Warmerdam participated in the Vergani Cup. He scored 7/9 to take first place, half-a-point clear of the rest of the field. In this process, he earned his third grandmaster norm. Van Foreest won the tournament and Warmerdam received praise for his work as second. When the interrupted Candidates Tournament resumed in April 2021, Warmerdam was a second to Anish Giri.

In August 2021, Warmerdam finished clear first in the Guimarães Open with 8/9 (+7–0=2), half-a-point ahead of Hans Niemann, Guillaume Lamard, and Stamatis Kourkoulos Arditis.

He won the Dutch Chess Championship in 2021, finishing on 5/6 in the final four-player round-robin.

Personal life
Born in 2000, Warmerdam is from Tegelen in Limburg. As of 2021, he is a student of economics at Tilburg University.

References

External links
Twitch account
Twitter profile

2000 births
Living people
Chess grandmasters
Dutch chess players
People from Tegelen
Sportspeople from Limburg (Netherlands)